Uranotaenia (Pseudoficalbia) obscura is a species of zoophilic mosquito belonging to the genus Uranotaenia. It is found in Sri Lanka, Australia, Cambodia, India, Indonesia, Malaysia, New Guinea, Papua New Guinea, Philippines, Singapore, and Thailand. The species can found from undersides of banana leaves.

References

External links
Notes on the Genus Uranotaenia

obscura
Insects described in 1915